Tai William (born 30 March 1997) is a Taiwanese speed skater. He competed in the 2018 Winter Olympics.

References

External links
 

1997 births
Living people
Speed skaters at the 2018 Winter Olympics
Taiwanese male speed skaters
Olympic speed skaters of Taiwan
21st-century Taiwanese people